Cedar Cove is a drama television series on the Hallmark Channel that aired for three seasons from July 20, 2013, to September 26, 2015. Based on author Debbie Macomber's book series of the same name, Cedar Cove focused on Municipal Court Judge Olivia Lockhart's professional and personal life and the townsfolk surrounding her. It was the network's first original scripted series, and lasted three seasons.

Plot 
Cedar Cove is a quaint, picturesque town on an island in the Puget Sound. Neighbors for the most part try to help each other, and people do not lock their doors in their trust in the community. The moral center and compass of the town is Olivia Lockhart, the bicycle-riding, scarf-wearing municipal court judge who grew up in the town. Regardless of her being the focus for many in town, Olivia's life has not been issue-free, she long ago had gone through a divorce from her physician husband; the dissolution of their marriage largely was due to the accidental drowning death of their son, Jordan, when he was 13, an incident from which they as a couple could not recover. Also affected was Jordan's twin sister, Justine, now a young woman, who has been struggling to find her place in life ever since. Much like the town is being pulled in different directions, such as by cutthroat developer Warren Saget, Olivia is often pulled in different directions, personally and professionally, which one day may take her away from Cedar Cove. In the former category is her search for love. Through it all, she acts as supporter to her friends and family, including librarian Grace Sherman, her best friend since they were children.

Cast and characters

Main cast
 Andie MacDowell as Olivia Lockhart, Cedar Cove Municipal Court judge
 Dylan Neal as Jack Griffith, editor of the local newspaper, the Cedar Cove Chronicle, an admitted recovering alcoholic, and Olivia's love interest
 Teryl Rothery as Grace Sherman, Olivia's librarian best friend
 Sarah Smyth as Justine Lockhart, Olivia's artistic daughter who is an insecure person, largely because of the death of her twin brother Jordan when they were 13, and the resulting dissolution of her parents' marriage
 Brennan Elliott as Warren Saget, a cutthroat Cedar Cove land developer
 Bruce Boxleitner and Barbara Niven as Bob and Peggy Beldon, a married couple and owners of the local bed and breakfast, 'Thyme and Tide',
 Timothy Webber  as Moon, the aged hippie proprietor of Moon's, a café/knick-knack store
 Corey Sevier as Seth Gunderson, Justine's high-school boyfriend, who now a commercial fisherman, returns to town in hopes of renewing their relationship, portrayed by Greyston Holt in the pilot episode (seasons one and two)
 Paula Shaw as Charlotte Jeffers, Olivia's headstrong mother (season one)
 Delilah (voiceover only), a nationally syndicated radio host, she provides quotes and inspirational passages as the host of her radio show in-universe in a fictional sense. These set up some of the plot devices, which occur throughout each episode. (season 1)
 Elyse Levesque as Maryellen Sherman, Grace's daughter (seasons one and three, recurring season two)
 Sebastian Spence as Cliff Harting, a rancher, was estranged from his father, once famous country singer Tom Harting, at the time of Tom's death. (seasons two and three, recurring season one)
 Tom Stevens as Eric Griffith, Jack's irresponsible son, he blames much of that irresponsibility on the fact that he had no male role model growing up. (season two, recurring seasons one and three)
 Jesse Hutch as Luke Bailey, an ex-Navy SEAL suffering from PTSD (seasons two and three)
 Emily Tennant as Cecilia Rendall, a high school friend of Justine's (season two, recurring season three), portrayed by Katharine Isabelle in the series' pilot
 Cameron Bancroft as Will Jeffers, Olivia's philandering brother (season three, recurring seasons one and two)
 Cindy Busby as Rebecca Jennings, the young, ambitious assistant district attorney (season three, recurring season two)
 Rebecca Marshall as Alex Baldwin, a ranch hand, ex-stockbroker, and recovering alcoholic (season three, recurring season two)
 Colin Ferguson as Paul Watson, the new district attorney (season three)
 Tom Butler as Buck Saget, Warren's wealthy businessman father (season three)

Recurring cast
 Charlie Carrick as John Bowman, an artist and chef, he served jail time for a crime committed by his brother, and ends up as Maryellen's love interest, portrayed by Giles Panton beginning in season three.
 Hayley Sales as Shelly, Eric's folk-singing girlfriend
 Mike Dopud as Roy Mcafee, a private investigator
 Jesse Moss as Ian Rendall, Cecilia's military husband
 Garry Chalk as Cedar Cove Sheriff Troy Davis (seasons one and two)
 Matreya Fedor as Allison Weston, a high-school student who volunteers at the library (seasons one and two)
 Andrew Airlie as Stan Lockhart, Olivia's ex-husband and Justine's father, he left the family following the death of their son Jordan. He is a Seattle-based physician, and is remarried. (season one)
 Julia Benson as Jeri Drake, a journalist and one of Jack's ex-wives (seasons two and three)
 Chris William Martin as Anthony, the district attorney (seasons two and three)
 Sarah-Jane Redmond as Corrie Mcafee, Roy's wife (season three)
 Anna Van Hooft as Linnette Mcafee, Roy and Corrie's daughter, a physician assistant (season three)
 Andrew Francis as Derek, Seth's fisherman friend (season three)
 Tara Wilson as Gloria Ashton, the daughter Roy and Corrie gave up for adoption (season three)
 Laura Mennell as Kelly, Warren's estranged wife (season three)
 Bruce Dawson as David, the hands-on owner of the Seattle Chronicle (season three)

Production

Setting and filming
Although filmed in Vancouver, British Columbia, the setting for the series (both book and television) is based on Port Orchard, Washington, producer/writer Debbie Macomber's summer residence.

"Cedar Cove" is the community of Deep Cove in North Vancouver, BC. Macomber stated that she tried to get the series filmed in Washington. "We did get tax incentives [for filmmakers] back but the problem is we don't have the infrastructure Canada does," she said.

With the announcement of the July 19, 2014, premiere date for the second season, Hallmark also announced that Sue Tenney, executive producer and writer for 7th Heaven, would take over as series showrunner.

Book to television deviation
In the book series, Grace's husband is disturbed by his actions in the Vietnam War and commits suicide, but for the television series, Macomber revealed that the network considered that "too heavy" of a storyline. Instead, Grace arrives home from vacation to announce her husband is divorcing her.

Reception
Cedar Cove was given "generally favorable" reviews at the Metacritic website, based on the aggregate score of 62 out of 100 from ten critics.  The Wall Street Journals Nancy DeWolf Smith called the series "relaxing," adding that it is "as burden-free as a day on the beach with an umbrella, a book, and a breeze." Mary McNamara of the Los Angeles Times commented, "Despite a certain built-in B&B preciousness, Cedar Cove evokes certain splendid shows of another time and place, including the late-great Family and the longtime Irish hit Ballykissangel.'" The New York Timess Neil Genzlinger commented that the "able" cast "makes it stand out from the stream of interchangeable Hallmark movies that aim for the same tone and audience."

Ellen Gray of the Philadelphia Daily News commented on the difference between Hallmark's standard fare and Cedar Cove, "While [Hallmark] movies are often forced to rush headlong toward their happy endings, a series can take more time. And in [the] four subsequent episodes I've seen, the stories and characters get to breathe a bit." The New York Posts Linda Stasi stated, "It ain't brain surgery and nobody's going to win any Emmys, but that's not why fans watch Hallmark." David Hinckley of New York's Daily News stated, "From the early evidence...there's every indication a Hallmark series will be the same sort of television comfort food as a Hallmark movie."

The Pittsburgh Post-Gazettes Rob Owen called the series "comfortable, uncomplicated, unchallenging entertainment," adding, "which makes it ideal for Hallmark's brand. Fans of Hallmark's movies will enjoy it; viewers who want to be more engaged and absorbed by a program may be bored." Brian Lowry of Variety stated,"There's still a distinction to be drawn between 'light' and 'weightless,' which is roughly where this new show registers—in part because the Olivia-Jack relationship is the only aspect with any resonance."

Ratings for Cedar Cove made Hallmark the top cable channel for its time slot on Saturdays.

Episodes

International distribution
The show began airing in the United Kingdom on 5 USA from February 9, 2014. The second season aired in the UK from May through June 2015 in a series of feature-length episodes, each consisting of two standard episodes. The show began airing in Turkey on Dizimax Drama on 5 March 2014. The show began airing in Greece on NovaCinema 1, NovaCinemaHD on June 4, 2014. The show began airing in Germany on Sat.1 Emotions on March 18, 2014, and aired Tuesdays at 8 p.m. The free-TV premiere took place on January 6, 2015 on the German Disney Channel. The show began airing in Italy on Rai1 on July 1, 2015, and airs Wednesdays at 9 p.m. Series 2 was shown immediately afterwards, starting on 18 August 2015 airing on Tuesday and Wednesday nights in blocks of three episodes, finishing on 26 August 2015. In Brazil, it began to appear in the Brazilian cable channel Mais Globosat on January 23, 2018. The show is also televised on Superchannel Heart & Home in Canada.

Home media
On July 15, 2014, Cinedigm (under license from Hallmark) released the first season of Cedar Cove in a three-disc DVD set. On July 14, 2015, the second season was also released in a three-disc DVD set. A three-disc DVD set of the third and final season was released on March 15, 2016.

References

External links
 
 

2010s American drama television series
2013 American television series debuts
2015 American television series endings
2010s Canadian drama television series
2013 Canadian television series debuts
2015 Canadian television series endings
English-language television shows
Television shows set in Washington (state)
Hallmark Channel original programming
2010s American romance television series
Canadian romance television series
Television shows filmed in Vancouver